James Toulmin Morris (25 March 1833 – 2 April 1912) was an Australian politician who represented the South Australian House of Assembly multi-member seat of Victoria from 1896 to 1902.

He was proprietor of the Mount Gambier newspaper, the S. E. Star. Morris Street, Mount Gambier, was named for him.

References

1833 births
1912 deaths
Members of the South Australian House of Assembly